One Heartbeat is a million-selling 1987 album by R&B singer/songwriter Smokey Robinson. It hit number 26 on the US Billboard Album Chart and number 1 on the US Billboard R&B album chart.

The album contains Robinson's last two US Billboard top 10 singles: "Just to See Her" (which won Robinson a Grammy Award in the category of Best Male R&B Vocal performance) and "One Heartbeat". "What's Too Much" was released as the album's third and final single. The album was certified Gold by the RIAA.

Track listing
"Just to See Her" (Jimmy George, Lou Pardini) - 4:04
"One Heartbeat" (Brian Ray, Steve LeGassick) - 4:07
"It's Time to Stop Shoppin' Around" (Robinson, Marsha Gold) - 4:02
"Why Do Happy Memories Hurt So Bad" (Robinson, Marvin Tarplin) - 4:06
"You Don't Know What It's Like" (Robinson, Reed Nielsen, Sue Shifrin) - 3:55
"What's Too Much"  (Robinson, Ivory Stone, Lonnie Kirtz, Pepi Talbert) - 4:23
"Love Brought Us Here Tonight" (duet with Syreeta Wright) (Robinson, Stephen Geyer, Allan Rich) - 3:57
"Love Don't Give No Reason" (Robinson, Steven Tavani) - 4:25
"Keep Me" (Robinson) - 4:58

Personnel
 Smokey Robinson – lead vocals
 Robbie Buchanan – keyboards (1, 2, 4, 5, 8, 9), arrangements (5, 8)
 Lou Pardini – synthesizer solo (1)
 Rick Chudacoff – arrangements (1, 3, 4, 6, 8, 9), synth bass (3), acoustic piano (6)
 Steve LeGassick – keyboards (2), arrangements (2)
 Bill Elliott – keyboards (3)
 Reginald "Sonny" Burke – keyboards (3, 4), acoustic piano solo (6), organ (6)
 Dann Huff – guitar (1, 3-9)
 Brian Ray – guitar (2), drum programming (2), arrangements (2)
 Neil Stubenhaus – bass guitar (1, 4, 9)
 John Robinson – drums (1, 4, 5, 9)
 Peter Bunetta – arrangements (1, 3, 4, 6, 8, 9), drums (3), drum programming (6), bass synth programming (6)
 Brad Buxer – drum programming (6, 7), bass synth programming (6), keyboards (7), synthesizer programming (7), rhythm track arrangements (7)
 Tom Seufert – drum programming (8)
 Paulinho da Costa – percussion (1, 3, 9)
 Kenny G – sax solo (2, 9), soprano sax solo (4)
 Danny Pelfrey – alto saxophone (3)
 Greg Smith – baritone saxophone (3)
 Jerry Jumonville – tenor saxophone (3)
 Bruce Paulsen – trombone (3)
 Darrell Leonard – trumpet (3, 6), horn arrangements (3)
 John Thomas – trumpet (3)
 Jerry Peterson – EWI controller (8)
 Leslie Smith – backing vocals (1, 4, 5)
 Tim Stone – backing vocals (1)
 Patti Henley – backing vocals (2, 4-9)
 Ivory Stone – backing vocals (3, 4-9)
 The Temptations – backing vocals (3)
 Howard Smith – backing vocals (4, 5)
 Alfie Silas – backing vocals (5-9)
 Maxayn Lewis – backing vocals (5)
 Kal David – backing vocals (5)
 Syreeta Wright – lead vocals (7)

Production
 Producers – Peter Bunetta and Rick Chudacoff
 Executive Producer – Berry Gordy
 Coordination – Sharon Burston
 Engineered by Daren Klein
 Additional Recording – Richard McKernan and Frank Wolf 
 Assistant Engineers – Troy Krueger, Bob Loftus, Richard McKernan, Marnie Riley and Gary Wagner.
 Mixing – Daren Klein (Tracks 1-9); Mick Guzauski (Tracks 1, 2, 4-7 & 9).
 Art Direction – Johnny Lee
 Design – Andy Engel
 Front Cover Photo – Bonnie Schiffman
 Back Cover Photo – Ron Slenzak

Charts

Weekly charts

Year-end charts

Certifications

Singles

References

1987 albums
Smokey Robinson albums
Motown albums